Kevin Welch is the eponymous debut album by Kevin Welch, one of the cofounders of the Dead Reckoning Records label. This album is one of two albums Kevin made while he was signed with Reprise Records.

Track listing

Musicians
Kevin Welch: Vocals, guitar
Michael Henderson: Guitar
Biff Watson: Keyboards, guitar
Glen Worf: Bass
Harry Stinson: Drums

Production
Paul Worley & Ed Seay: Producers
Sharon Eaves: Production assistant
Doug Grau: A&R Direction
Ed Seay: Recording & Mixing
Denny Purcell: Mastering
Peter Nash: Photography
Laura Lipuma: Art direction, Design

All track information and credits were taken from the CD liner notes.

References

External links
Kevin Welch Official Site
Dead Reckoning Records Official Site

1990 debut albums
Reprise Records albums
Kevin Welch albums
Albums produced by Paul Worley